Marianne Fredbo née Mæland (born 10 October 1986) is a former Norwegian Paralympic swimmer who competed in international level events. Her highest achievement is winning a bronze medal at the 2009 IPC Swimming World Championships in the 100 m breaststroke SB6. She has represented Norway at the 2008 and 2012 Summer Paralympics but did not medal. Fredbo's right arm and left leg were amputated in a lawnmower accident when she was four years old.

References

1986 births
Living people
People from Lyngdal
Sportspeople from Kristiansand
Paralympic swimmers of Norway
Swimmers at the 2008 Summer Paralympics
Swimmers at the 2012 Summer Paralympics
Medalists at the World Para Swimming Championships
Norwegian amputees
Norwegian female breaststroke swimmers
S7-classified Paralympic swimmers
21st-century Norwegian women